Tim Pidgeon (born September 20, 1964) is a former American football linebacker. He played for the Miami Dolphins in 1987.

References

1964 births
Living people
American football linebackers
Syracuse Orange football players
Miami Dolphins players
National Football League replacement players